The men's 3000 metres steeplechase event at the 1928 Olympic Games took place August 1 & August 4.

Results

Heats

Heat 1

Key: Q = Qualified

Heat 2

Key: DNF = Did not finish, Q = Qualified

Heat 3

Key: Q = Qualified

Final

Key: DNF = Did not finish, WR = World record

References

Men's 3000 m steeplechase
Steeplechase at the Olympics
Men's events at the 1928 Summer Olympics